{{DISPLAYTITLE:C16H14N4O}}
The molecular formula C16H14N4O (molar mass: 278.31 g/mol, exact mass: 278.1168 u) may refer to:

 Adibendan
 Sudan Yellow 3G, also known as Solvent Yellow 16 or C.I. disperse yellow

Molecular formulas